Liudolf of Brunswick (c. 1003 – 23 April 1038) was Margrave of Frisia, Count of Brunswick, Count in the Derlingau and the Gudingau.

Liudolf was a descendant of the Saxon family of the Brunonen.  He was a son of Bruno I, Count of Brunswick, and Gisela of Swabia. After the death of his father, Liudolf's mother remarried several times, her last marriage was to Conrad II, Holy Roman Emperor. Therefore, Holy Roman Emperor Henry III was his younger half-brother. Liudolf married Gertrude of Egisheim and had four children. He controlled the Frisian counties Oostergo, Zuidergo and Westergo. For two more generations the Brunonen family line inherited the title. How the Brunonen came to their position in the counties is not known. There is a theory that Liudolf took advantage of the reign of violence by the Counts of Holland in the part of Friesland between the Vlie and the Lauwers. Not much is known about his life.  He died in 1038 and was succeeded by his son, Bruno II.

Family

Liudolf and Gertrude of Egisheim had the following children:

 Bruno II (around 1024 – 26 June 1057)
 Egbert I, Margrave of Meissen (died 1068)
 Matilda of Frisia (died 1044); married King Henry I of France.
 Ida of Elsdorf, married to Leopold (Luitpold, Lippold) of Babenberg †1043 Hungarian March. Their daughter Oda of Stade married Sviatoslav II Yaroslavich, Grand Prince of Kiev.
 (possibly) Agatha, wife of Edward the Exile, of the royal family of England, the mother of Edgar the Ætheling and Saint Margaret of Scotland.

References

Bibliography

Die familiären Verbindungen der Brunonen
Liudolf   Graf von Braunschweig
 Braunschweigisches Biographisches Lexikon, Appelhans 2006, 
Mladjov, "Reconsidering Agatha, Wife of Eadward the Exile". The Plantagenet Connection 11 (2003). p. 1–85.

Counts of Frisia
1000s births
1038 deaths
Brunonids
Counts of Brunswick